Heterocallia truncaria is a moth of the family Geometridae first described by John Henry Leech in 1897. It is found in China and Taiwan.

References

Moths described in 1897
Macariini